Jeffrey Franklin Kent (born March 7, 1968) is an American former professional baseball second baseman. He played 17 seasons in Major League Baseball (MLB) from 1992–2008 for the Toronto Blue Jays, New York Mets, Cleveland Indians, San Francisco Giants, Houston Astros, and Los Angeles Dodgers.

Kent won the National League Most Valuable Player award in 2000 with the San Francisco Giants, and is the all-time leader in home runs among second basemen. He drove in 90 or more runs from 1997 to 2005. Kent is a five-time All-Star, and his 560 career doubles put him in 30th on the all-time doubles list.

Early life
Born in Bellflower, California, Kent graduated from Edison High School in Huntington Beach, California, where he was dismissed from the baseball team after clashing with his coach over a position change.

College career
Kent played college baseball at UC Berkeley, and in 1988 he played collegiate summer baseball with the Cotuit Kettleers of the Cape Cod Baseball League.

Professional career
Kent was selected in the 20th round of the 1989 MLB Draft by the Toronto Blue Jays.

Toronto Blue Jays (1992)
After three seasons in the minor leagues, Kent was invited to spring training with the Blue Jays in 1992 and made the opening day roster. He made his debut on April 12 against the Baltimore Orioles and recorded his first career hit (a double) in the 6th inning against José Mesa. He hit his first home run on April 14 against New York Yankees pitcher Lee Guetterman. He saw limited at-bats early in the season; however, an injury to starting third baseman Kelly Gruber granted Kent a more regular role in the line-up.

New York Mets (1992–1996)
Kent was traded to the Mets on August 27, 1992, for pitcher David Cone, as Toronto bolstered their pitching rotation for a successful World Series run. Kent's time with the Mets was marked with some success and some failure. Although he batted well, particularly for a second baseman, the Mets were among the worst teams in the National League. Furthermore, he acquired a very poor reputation in the clubhouse, where he was known for a quick temper and isolationism. He refused to participate in his hazing ritual with the Mets, feeling he had left his rookie status back in Toronto. During the 1992 season, he started the only game of his career at shortstop in order to allow Willie Randolph to play his final career game at second base.

Cleveland Indians (1996)
In a deal made prior to the 1996 trade deadline, the Mets sent Kent and José Vizcaíno to the Cleveland Indians for Álvaro Espinoza and Carlos Baerga. The following offseason, Kent was again traded, this time to the San Francisco Giants along with José Vizcaíno and Julián Tavárez. The San Francisco trade was initially very unpopular, as it sent Matt Williams, a longtime Giant and a fan-favorite, to the Indians. Brian Sabean, in his first year as general manager of the Giants, was so widely criticized for the move that he famously defended himself to the media by saying, "I am not an idiot."

San Francisco Giants (1997–2002)
Kent's career took off in San Francisco, starting in 1997. Immediately inserted in the line-up behind superstar Barry Bonds, and with the confidence of manager Dusty Baker, Kent finally rose to his full potential, hitting .250 with 29 home runs and 121 RBI. He was consistently among the top RBI hitters in the league over his next five seasons with the Giants, amassing 689 RBI over six years. He also won the 1998 Willie Mac Award for his spirit and leadership. Kent's contributions were recognized in 2000 (33 home runs, 125 RBI, .334 batting average, and a .986 fielding percentage) with the National League MVP Award, beating out teammate and perennial MVP candidate Barry Bonds. Despite the fact that Bonds overshadowed Kent in almost every offensive category, it was Kent's clutch hitting in RBI spots that won many games for the Giants that year, and ultimately won him the award. The Giants finished first in the NL West at 97–65, but lost to the Mets in the National League Division Series 3–1.

In 2002, Kent had another stellar year for a second baseman (37 home runs, 108 RBI, .313 batting average, and a .978 fielding percentage). The combination of Kent and MVP-winner Bonds propelled the Giants to a 95–66 record, good enough for the NL Wild Card. The Giants would beat the Atlanta Braves in the National League Division Series 3–2 and the St. Louis Cardinals in the National League Championship Series 4–1. In the World Series for the first time since 1989, the Giants would nearly clinch the championship (failing to hold a 5–0, 7th-inning lead) in the sixth game, before falling to the Anaheim Angels in seven games. Despite the team's success that season, Kent's relationship with the Giants had soured. The Giants front office had lost confidence in Kent after an incident during spring training left him with a broken wrist. Kent had initially claimed that he had broken his wrist after slipping and falling while washing his truck; ensuing media reports indicated that, in reality, Kent had crashed his motorcycle while performing wheelies and other stunts, in direct violation of his contract.

In addition, growing tension that had been developing between Kent and Bonds for years finally boiled over: a midseason fight in the Giants dugout was widely reported in 2002 and caught on television. The feud between the two was so bad that, at the end of the season, San Francisco Chronicle beat reporter Ray Ratto said of the two, "The one who lives longer will attend the other's funeral, just to make sure he's dead." The departure of manager Dusty Baker also factored into Kent's eventual decision to leave the Giants.

Houston Astros (2003–2004)
During the 2002 offseason, Kent signed a two-year, $19.9 million deal with the Houston Astros, citing his desire to be closer to his family's Texas ranch.
Kent turned one of the outs and collected an assist during a triple play on August 19, 2004, against Philadelphia, when Todd Pratt grounded out with the bases loaded in the fifth inning. Kent forced Marlon Byrd out at second base before throwing Pratt out at first base. It was Houston's first triple play turned in 13 years.

On October 2, 2004, he hit his 288th home run as a second baseman, surpassing Ryne Sandberg as the all-time home run leader at that position. In Game 5 of the 2004 National League Championship Series, Kent hit a three-run walk-off home run in the bottom of the ninth to break a scoreless tie and put Houston ahead of the St. Louis Cardinals three games to two in the series. However, the Cardinals would win Games 6 and 7 in St. Louis to capture the pennant.

Los Angeles Dodgers (2005–2008)
On December 14, 2004, he signed a $21 million contract for three years with his hometown Los Angeles Dodgers. Kent started at second base for the National League in the 2005 Major League Baseball All-Star Game at Comerica Park, his fifth career All-Star selection and fourth career All-Star start. Kent became the first player in the history of the Dodgers–Giants rivalry to make and start the Midsummer Classic for both clubs. Joc Pederson has since joined this list. Kent had a good 2005 season, leading the Dodgers in batting average, on-base percentage, slugging, runs, hits, doubles, home runs and RBI (.289, .377, .512, 100, 160, 36, 29, and 105 respectively). While missing games early on in the 2006 season because of an oblique injury, he came back late in the season and helped the Dodgers reach the postseason. After the 2005 season, Kent signed an extension that would take him to the 2008 season. Following 2008, Kent announced his retirement from baseball on January 22, 2009.

Career statistics
In 2,298 games over 17 seasons, Kent posted a .290 batting average (2461-for-8498) with 1320 runs, 560 doubles, 47 triples, 377 home runs, 1518 RBI, 94 stolen bases, 801 bases on balls, .356 on-base percentage and .500 slugging percentage. He finished his career with a .978 fielding percentage. In 49 postseason games, he hit .276 (47-for-170) with 25 runs, 11 doubles, 9 home runs, 23 RBI and 13 walks. Kent hit 351 home runs as a second baseman, the most in MLB history in either league.

Post-playing career
Kent and his wife Dana reside near Austin, Texas, where they raise their four children, a daughter and three sons. He also owns the  "Diamond K" cattle ranch near Tilden, Texas. In 2008, Kent purchased the Lakecliff Country Club in Spicewood, Texas. Kent also owns Kent Powersports, a chain of motorcycle and ATV dealerships.

Kent appeared as a contestant on the Summer 2009 television series Superstars, where he was teamed with actress Ali Landry in a series of sports competitions. They finished in fifth place in the competition. In 2012, Kent participated in Survivor: Philippines, the 25th season of the American CBS competitive reality television series Survivor. He was the eighth contestant voted off, which placed him tenth and made him the second member of the jury, giving him a right to vote for the eventual winner at the Final Tribal Council. When he was voted off, Kent claimed that the million dollar prize was "six hundred grand by the time Obama takes it".

He has been an advocate for Major League Baseball using blood tests for HGH. Since 2011, Kent has served as a spring training instructor for the San Francisco Giants. He also coaches his sons' Little League teams, and in 2014 he became a volunteer assistant for Southwestern University's baseball team. In 2011, Kent donated $100,000 and raised awareness to help reinstate the Cal baseball program, which was being cut for cost-saving purposes. In 2014, Kent announced the creation of the Jeff Kent Women Driven Scholarship Endowment to provide a full scholarship each year to one female student-athlete at UC Berkeley in perpetuity.

In 2008, Kent donated to the campaign to ban same-sex marriage in California.

National Baseball Hall of Fame consideration
Eligible for the National Baseball Hall of Fame for the first time in 2014, Kent's chances were felt to be low because of poor defense and the tainted era he played in. Indeed, Baseball Writers' Association of America (BBWAA) voters gave Kent just 15.2% of their votes in his first year, well short of the 75% required for induction. Among 17 returnees to the ballot in 2015, Kent was one of only three who saw a decrease in support, dropping to 14.0%. His support increased in subsequent elections, reaching 32.7% in 2022, his ninth appearance on the ballot. A player may remain on the ballot a maximum of 10 years.

Personal life

Kent and his wife, Dana, are members of the Church of Jesus Christ of Latter-day Saints. His daughter, Lauren, and his eldest son, Hunter, both attended Brigham Young University (BYU) in Provo, Utah. Lauren graduated from BYU in December 2017, and Hunter played on the practice squad for the Cougars, before taking leave to serve a two-year mission in Mexico.

Kent's son, Colton, played his prep baseball at Lake Travis High School, in Austin, Texas. Colton signed to play college baseball at BYU, but transferred to the College of Southern Idaho (CSI) after a year at BYU.

Accomplishments

Five-time All-Star (1999–2001, 2004–05)
Four-time Silver Slugger (2000–2002, 2005)
National League MVP (2000)
Finished 6th in National League MVP voting (2002)
Finished 8th in National League MVP voting (1997)
Finished 9th in National League MVP voting (1998)
Finished Top-5 in RBIs (1997, 1998, 2000, 2002)
All-time leader in home runs as a second baseman (377)
Only second baseman to have 100 or more RBIs in six consecutive seasons (1997–2002)
Hit for the cycle (1999)

See also

List of Major League Baseball career home run leaders
List of Major League Baseball career hits leaders
List of Major League Baseball career doubles leaders
List of Major League Baseball career runs scored leaders
List of Major League Baseball career runs batted in leaders
List of Major League Baseball career total bases leaders
List of Major League Baseball players who hit for the cycle

References

External links
, or Retrosheet, or Pelota Binaria (Venezuelan Winter League)

1968 births
Living people
American expatriate baseball players in Canada
Baseball players from Los Angeles
California Golden Bears baseball players
Cardenales de Lara players
American expatriate baseball players in Venezuela
Cleveland Indians players
Dunedin Blue Jays players
Houston Astros players
Los Angeles Dodgers players
Knoxville Blue Jays players
Major League Baseball second basemen
National League All-Stars
National League Most Valuable Player Award winners
New York Mets players
People from Bellflower, California
Round Rock Express players
San Francisco Giants players
Silver Slugger Award winners
Sportspeople from Huntington Beach, California
St. Catharines Blue Jays players
Survivor (American TV series) contestants
Toronto Blue Jays players
University of California, Berkeley alumni
Cotuit Kettleers players
Anchorage Bucs players